The discography of Russ, who is an American rapper and record producer.

Studio albums

Extended plays

Singles

As lead artist

As featured artist

Promotional singles

Other charted and certified songs

Notes

References

Discographies of American artists
Discography
Hip hop discographies